Amara carinata is a species of beetle of the genus Amara in the family Carabidae.

References

carinata
Beetles described in 1848
Taxa named by John Lawrence LeConte